Meaver is a hamlet east of Mullion and in the parish of Mullion in west Cornwall, England.

References

Hamlets in Cornwall
Mullion, Cornwall